Kira Katherine Reed also known as Kira Reed Lorsch, is an American actress, television host, writer, and producer.

Early life 
Reed was born in Santa Clara, California, and by age five was performing in school plays and local dance recitals. By age 10, she was doing commercials and local catalog modeling. When her family moved to Louisville, Kentucky, she attended the Youth Performing Arts School and then went on to graduate from UCLA's School of Theatre, Film and Television.

Career 
In addition to appearances as "Herself" and/or on behalf of organizations she works with, the list of Reed's credits includes producer, writer, director, and stunt person.  She has appeared in movies, including starring roles in Red Shoe Diaries and The Price Of Desire, and on network television, on shows such as ER, NYPD Blue and The War at Home. She was a reporter and producer on Playboy TV's series Sexcetera, produced the second season of the Naked Happy Girls series and was both a writer and supervising producer on Playboy's hit travel/reality show 69 Sexy Things 2 Do Before You Die. Reed has worked as the backstage host for the Daytime Emmy Awards  and a reporter for the Hollywood Christmas Parade. She was featured on Bravo Interior Therapy with Jeff Lewis with her husband Robert Lorsch.

She is president of The RHL Group, an event-production and entertainment company founded by Robert Lorsch, producing charity events, feature films and television programming. In December 2012,  Reed's Score: How to Win the Girl of Your Dreams book was published. She has done SCORE book signing events in the US and in the UK in partnership with Hard Rock Cafe.

Reed joined the cast of the Emmy nominated The Bay in 2014 and its producing team soon thereafter. The drama series won a Daytime Emmy for Outstanding Drama Series - New Approaches in 2015 and Reed herself took home an Emmy as a producer on the show in 2016.  and again in 2017. In 2018, she received her first acting Emmy nomination as Outstanding Supporting Actress in a Digital Daytime Drama Series for her role of "Jo Connors" on The Bay. She was nominated for Best Actress for her portrayal of "Morgan" in the feature Acts of Desperation, and received a Lifetime Achievement award for her body of work in independent film at the 2019 New Vision International Film Festival.  In 2020 Ms. Lorsch and The RHL Group joined forces with Pure Flix to executive produce the faith-based action thriller Beckman in which she starred as "Janice" alongside David A.R. White and William Baldwin.  In Love on the Rock, shot in Malta during the pandemic for Sony/Pinnacle Peak Pictures, Kira co-stars again with David A.R. White and Steven Bauer. Kira co-starred in the drama series Rumors as “Ellen” - acting teacher to young Hollywood. She took home the 2022 Indie Series Award for Best Supporting actress for her role. 

Reed's appearances in erotica included posing for Playboy Magazine in December 1996, in a group pictorial of women from the television series Women: Stories of Passion,  and appearing in direct-to-video (DTV) movies like Secrets of a Chambermaid. In The Erotic Thriller in Contemporary Cinema, Linda Ruth Williams cited Reed and Delia Sheppard as examples of actresses who worked "...in B-scale erotic thrillers at the fringes of Hollywood, the obvious trajectory for a strip-circuit veteran (DTV divas Kira Reed and Delia Sheppard both started as showgirls.)" The book also reproduces a quote from an article at Playboy.com, with Williams again making specific reference to Reed. "Video may have killed the radio star, but it proved a real boon to Playmates in the Eighties, who played a not insignificant role in that decade's video revolution" Kira is featured in the 2023 documentary We Kill For Love about the lost genre of the direct-to-video erotic thriller.

Personal life 
Kira married Robert Lorsch (died 2017) in 2008.  
Kira Reed Lorsch served as president of the mental health organization The Thalians supporting programs for the wounded military men and women and their families of UCLA Operation Mend. She also supports Shelter Hope Pet Shop, a Thousand Oaks animal rescue group that puts dogs that might otherwise face euthanasia up for adoption instead. She appears as Ms. June in Shelter Hope's 2015 fundraising calendar. She is an ambassador for the mental health awareness campaign Imperfectly Perfect. She was profiled in Angeleno Magazine's "Dynamic Women of Los Angeles" 2018 and in "Icons Of Beverly Hills" in Modern Luxury Beverly Hills'  Fall/Winter 2018-2019 issue as well as the 2020 Modern Luxury Hope Issue. Kira is spotlighted in the October 2021 issue of Riviera Magazine as an actress, producer, philanthropist, and luxury lifestyle wellness travel blogger. She was the inaugural recipient of the Icon Award for Women In Philanthropy presented at the 4th Annual Roger Neal Oscar Viewing Dinner, Icon Awards and Party. Kira is the cover model for the Winter 2022 issue of HIM Magazine.

Filmography

Television 

 Treacherous Crossing (1992) .... Passenger Sherilyn
 Beverly Hills, 90210 (1 episode, 1994) .... Dancing Girl 
 Unsolved Mysteries (1 episode, 1996) .... Sara  
 Beverly Hills Bordello (1 episode, 1996) .... Jenny Cochran 
 Red Shoe Diaries (1 episode, 1996) .... Rita  
 Perversions of Science (1 episode, 1997) .... Vampiress  
 Click (2 episodes, 1997) .... Dominique  
 Women: Stories of Passion (1 episode, 1997) .... Marlene  
 Ultimate Trek: Star Trek's Greatest Moments (1999) .... Salesgirl
 Ryan Caulfield: Year One (1 episode, 1999) .... Nadine  
 Red Handed (1 episode, 1999) .... TV Host 
 Strip Mall (1 episode, 2000) .... Auditioning Actress  
 Madison Heights (1 episode, 2001) .... Susan  
 The Howard Stern Show (2 episodes, 2001) .... Herself
 NYPD Blue (4 episodes, 2002) .... Gloria Simmons  
 ER (1 episode, 2003) .... Shop Girl  
 The War at Home (1 episode, 2006) .... Mrs. Petrusky  
 Sexcetera (1998-2006) .... Reporter
 Chiller: 13 (2010) .... Commentator
 Today Show (2010) .... Herself
 Howard Stern on Demand (2 episodes, 2006-2010) .... Guest appearances 
 [[American Humane Association#The American Humane Association Hero Dog Awards|Hero Dog Awards]] (2011) .... Reporter
 Hell's Kitchen (2011) .... Herself
 The Daytime Emmy Awards (2009 - 2011) .... Backstage reporter
 Interior Therapy with Jeff Lewis (2012) .... Herself
 Money TV (7 Episodes, 2011 -2012) .... Commentator 
 Hollywood Christmas Parade (2009 -2014) .... Red Carpet Host/Reporter
 America's Newsroom (2013) .... Free Afridi Activist/Panelist
 Happening Now (2013) .... Herself
 Pit Boss (2013) .... Animal Rescue Advocate
 Fox and Friends (2013) .... Herself
 CBS LA (2012-2013) .... Pets 2 Love Lady 
 Thalians 55th Gala (2014) .... Executive Producer/Herself
 The 411 (2016-17) .... Reporter/Producer
 The 44th Annual Daytime Emmy Awards (2017) .... Self-Winner
 The Bay (2014-2018) .... Jo Connors
 Female Friendly (2018) .... The Madame
 Crystal: The Interview (2020) .... Linda
 Wild Wild Yogis (2020) .... Gwen
 Family Film Awards (2021) .... Self/Presenter/Winner
 Rumors (2021) .... Ellen
 Indie Series Awards (2022) .... Self/Presenter/Winner
 Good Day Live (2022-2023) .... Self/Special Guest

Movies 
 We Kill for Love (2023) .... Herself
 Love on the Rock (2021) .... Stoll
 Witches of Amityville Academy (2020) .... Sam
 Beckman (2020) .... Janice
 Acts of Desperation (2018) .... Morgan
 This Is Our Christmas (2018) .... Mrs. Hawkins
 Thalians 56th Anniversary Gala (2014) .... Host/Herself
 Thalians 55th Anniversary Gala (2011) .... Host/Herself
 Vampire (2010) .... Chloe
 Demon's Claw (2006) .... Elizabeth Balthory
 Jailbait (2004) .... Nurse Jeri
 BachelorMan (2003) .... Courtney Love Wannabe
 The Final Victim (2003) .... Nadia
 The Big Chingon (2003) .... Sara
 Cheerleader Ninjas (2002) .... Fantasy Girl
 Just Can't Get Enough (2002) .... Amber Lee
 Demon Under Glass (2002) .... Chloe Martin
 Rage of the Innocents (2001) .... Erica
 Amy's Orgasm (2001, also known as Amy's O) .... Shannon Steele 
 Forbidden Highway (2001) .... Cherry
 The Mistress Club (2000) .... Trudy
 House of Love (2000) .... Darby
 Fast Lane to Malibu (2000) .... Officer Taylor
 Surrender (2000) .... Lauren
 Luck of the Draw (2000) .... Zippo's Boudoir Girl 
 Stigmata (1999) ....Stunt Double
 Shadow Dancer (1999) .... Janet 
 Wasteland Justice (1999) .... Shanna
 Thriller: Caron (1999) .... Caron
 Killing the Vision (1999) .... Reporter
 Alien Files (1998) .... Agent Forrest 
 A Place Called Truth (1998) .... Kit
 Losing Control (1997, 1998, 1999, 2000) .... Kim
 Carnal Fate (1998) .... Mimi 
 Too Good to Be True (1997/II) .... Darcy
 Secrets of a Chambermaid (1997) .... Odile
 Madam Savant (1997) .... Suzy Largo
 The Price of Desire (1997) .... Monica
 The Night That Never Happened (1997) .... Claire
 Fallen Angel (1997) (as Kira Lee) .... Kristi
 The Lady in Blue (1996) .... Carla
 Damien's Seed (1996) .... Carol
 Secret Places (1996) .... Holly
 Maui Heat (1996) .... Sara
 Mr. Saturday Night (1992) .... Beauty Pageant Contestant

References

External links
 
 

20th-century American actresses
21st-century American actresses
Living people
People from Santa Clara, California
UCLA Film School alumni
Actresses from California
American television actresses
American film actresses
Television producers from California
American women television producers
Year of birth missing (living people)